is a 2000 Japanese mystery-thriller film, directed by Hideo Nakata. It stars Miki Nakatani and Masato Hagiwara. It is based on Shōgo Utano's novel .

Plot synopsis
A handyman (Masato Hagiwara) gets involved in a kidnapping scheme with the wife of a wealthy businessman. She lets herself be tied up and confined in his house while he sends the ransom demand. When he returns home that night, however, he finds her lying dead on the floor. In a panic, he buries her body deep in the woods and tries to return to his ordinary life. One day, he thinks he spots her walking down the street. Is his mind playing tricks on him, or has she somehow returned from the grave?

Cast
Masato Hagiwara - Handyman/Gorō Kuroda
Miki Nakatani - Satomi Tsushima
Ken Mitsuishi - Takayuki Komiyama
Jun Kunimura - Police Inspector Hamaguchi
Yuuna Natsuo

Critical reception
The film received favourable reviews, garnering a  73% rating on Rotten Tomatoes, certifying it as "fresh." and a 63 out of 100 grade on Metacritic, which means "generally favorable reviews."

References

External links

2000 films
Japanese nonlinear narrative films
2000 crime thriller films
Japanese crime thriller films
2000s Japanese-language films
Films directed by Hideo Nakata
Films scored by Kenji Kawai
2000s Japanese films